Ibrahim "Inspector" Bah (born 8 March 1969) is a former Sierra Leonean international footballer. His nickname amongst Sierra Leonean football fans is 'Inspector' Bah.

He played in Sierra Leone's successful 1995 Coupe Amilcar Cabral side, scoring twice in the group stage. He participated in the  1996 African Cup of Nations finals in South Africa, starting all three of Sierra Leone's matches as they were knocked out in the group stage.

In 1995/96 he was playing club football for Ports Authority.

References

1969 births
Living people
Sierra Leonean footballers
Sierra Leone international footballers
1996 African Cup of Nations players
Ports Authority F.C. players
People from Kono District
Association football defenders
Association football midfielders